Pyrgocythara guarani is a species of sea snail, a marine gastropod mollusk in the family Conidae, the cone snails and their allies.

Description
The length of the shell attains 5.5 mm.

The brownish shell shows sometimes narrow, lighter bands. The longitudinal ribs are prominent, rounded, crenelating the suture; There are elevated revolving lines.

Distribution
This marine species occurs off Florida, USA, and Southeastern Brazil.

References

 d'Orbigny. Moll. Amer. Mer., p. 445, pl. Ixxvii, f. 13, 14

External links
 
 

guarani
Gastropods described in 1841